Francisco de Silva, 10th Duke of Huéscar (in full), (1733–1770), was a Spanish nobleman.

He was the son of Fernando de Silva Mendoza y Toledo, 12th Duke of Alba and of Ana María Bernarda Álvarez de Toledo y Portugal. On 2 February 1757, he married Mariana del Pilar de Silva-Bazán y Sarmiento, and they had an only daughter, María del Pilar de Silva, who succeeded him as Duchess of Huéscar and later, her grandfather as Duchess of Alba.

Sources

1733 births
1770 deaths
Dukes of Huéscar
Francisco
Francisco